This is a list of wildlife management areas in West Virginia.

West Virginia wildlife management areas

References

See also

List of West Virginia state parks
List of West Virginia state forests

 01
Wildlife management areas
Wildlife management areas
Wildlife management areas
West Virginia
West Virginia
Wildlife management areas
West Virginia